The Roller Skating Federation of India (RSFI) is the national governing body for roller sports in India. The RSFI was established in 1955, and has been affiliated to the Fédération Internationale de Roller Sports (now World Skate) since 1971. The RSFI was a founder member of the Confederation Asian Roller Sports (CARS) in 1978. The Federation was officially recognized by the Union Ministry of Youth Affairs and Sports in September 1990, and was subsequently recognized by the Indian Olympic Association.

The RSFI holds the annual National Roller Sports Championships in for males and females in age groups Sub Juniors (8 to 12 years), Juniors (12 to 16 Years) and Seniors (above 16 years) in the disciplines of artistic skating, speed skating, inline freestyle, roller freestyle, roller hockey, inline hockey, inline downhill, inline alpine, skateboarding and roller derby.

Nineteen state and union territory associations are affiliated to the RSFI.

In July 2017, the RSFI announced that it was planning to introduce a professional roller sports league along the lines of the Indian Premier League, Pro Kabaddi, and the Pro Wrestling League.

See also
Roller sport in India
India national roller hockey team

References

Sports governing bodies in India
Roller sports
1955 establishments in India
Sports organizations established in 1955
Organisations based in Delhi